The 1896 Kentucky State College Blue and White football team represented Kentucky State College—now known as the University of Kentucky—as a member of the Southern Intercollegiate Athletic Association (SIAA) during the 1896 college football season. It was the school's first season as a member of the SIAA. Led by Dudley Short in his first and only season as head coach, the Blue and White compiled an overall record of 3–6 with a mark of 1–1 in SIAA play.

Schedule

References

Kentucky State College
Kentucky Wildcats football seasons
Kentucky State College Blue and White football